Nurul Haque Bhuiyan was a Bengali activist.

Career

Bhuiyan was a professor of Department of Chemistry and Applied Chemistry at the University of Dhaka during 1946–1994. He was a senior leader of the Tamaddun Majlish and the first convener of the Rastrabhasa Sangram Parishad during the Language Movement. He was the founder Provost of Sir A F Rahman Hall of the University of Dhaka. He was the first convenor of Language Movement during October 1947 - February 1948.

References

Living people
Bangladeshi politicians
Bengali language activists
Academic staff of the University of Dhaka
Year of birth missing (living people)